The Pitchfork Music Festival 2018 was held on July 20 to 22, 2018 at the Union Park, Chicago, United States. The festival was headlined by Tame Impala, Fleet Foxes and Ms. Lauryn Hill. Hill performed her entire debut solo record, The Miseducation of Lauryn Hill as the twentieth anniversary of the album.

Lineup
Headline performers are listed in boldface. Artists listed from latest to earliest set times.

Notes

References

External links

2018 music festivals
Pitchfork Music Festival